Osmar Eduardo Castillo Rojas is a Venezuelan football manager, currently in charge of Angostura.

Career
Born in Cabudare, Castillo started working as manager at several local sides in Lara state. He led Fundación Lara Deportiva to a first-ever promotion to the Segunda División in 2019, after winning the Tercera División promotion play-offs. After being in charge of the side during the 2020 and 2021 seasons (as the club was named Academia Rey), the side confirmed his departure on 24 March 2022.

Castillo was an assistant of Jorge Durán at Deportivo Lara, before taking over Angostura in the second division on 2 June 2022. At the end of the season, he led the team to a first-ever promotion to the Primera División as champions.

Honours
Angostura
Venezuelan Segunda División: 2022

References

Living people
People from Lara (state)
Venezuelan football managers
Venezuelan Segunda División managers
Angostura F.C. managers
Year of birth missing (living people)